George Edward Beasley (26 April 1902 – 6 August 1962) was an Australian rules footballer who played with Collingwood in the Victorian Football League (VFL).

Beasley came from Birregurra and played for Prahran before joining Collingwood.

He played in two losing grand finals for Collingwood, as a back pocket defender in 1925 and at full-back in 1926.

Beasley was playing coach of Williamstown 1929. He played 17 games and kicked 11 goals for 'Town in a season where the team won 9 games, lost 12 and finished in eighth position. He was replaced as captain-coach for 1930 by Jack O'Brien and Beasley crossed to Oakleigh.

Footnotes

References

External links
 
 George Beasley, at The VFA Project.
 George Beasley, at Collingwood Forever.

1902 births
Australian rules footballers from Victoria (Australia)
Collingwood Football Club players
Prahran Football Club players
Williamstown Football Club players
Williamstown Football Club coaches
1962 deaths